LaMotte is a ghost town in Pike County, in the U.S. state of Missouri. The GNIS classifies it as a populated place.

The community was named after an official at a local powdermill.

References

Ghost towns in Missouri
Former populated places in Pike County, Missouri